Cambridge Road is a road running from London to King's Lynn, England, as part of the A10 road.

Cambridge Road may also refer to:
 Cambridge Road, Hong Kong, which intersects Lancashire Road
 Cambridge Road, Ypres  a sector of the Ypres Salient between Wieltje and Hooge